Lingering Garden (Suzhou Wu: Leu yoe) is a renowned classical Chinese garden, dating back to 1593. It is located at 338 Liuyuan Rd. Suzhou, Jiangsu province, China (留园路338号). The garden is divided into 4 themed sections connected by covered walkways. The central garden encircles a pond and a grotto constructed of yellow stone granite. It was created by the noted artist Zhou Binzhong. 

In 1997, the Lingering Garden was recognized as a UNESCO World Heritage Site, along with seven other Classical Gardens of Suzhou. The garden also contains two UNESCO Intangible World Heritage Arts; Pingtan and Guqin music.

History
Lingering Garden is located outside the Changmen gate of Suzhou, Jiangsu province. It was commissioned by Xu Taishi, an impeached and later exonerated official in 1593 CE. Stonemason Zhou Shicheng designed and built the East Garden as it was initially called. The East Garden became famous in its day when the magistrates of Wu and Changzhou County both praised the design of Shi Ping Peak, a rockery constructed to resemble Tiantai Mountain in Putao.

Ownership passed to Liu Su, another official in 1798 CE.  After extensive reconstruction, he renamed it Cold Green Village after a verse, "clean cold color of bamboo, limpid green light of water". Keeping with that theme, he added pine and bamboo groves. He was an avid collector of Scholar stones and added 12 more to the garden housing them in the "stone forest". It was also at this time the "Celestial Hall of Five Peaks" was built. The garden soon acquired the nickname "Liu Yuan" from the owner's surname. From 1823 the garden was opened to the public, and became a famed resort.

Ownership passed to Sheng Kang, a provincial treasurer of Hubei in 1873. He repaired the damaged caused to the garden by the chaos of the Taiping. After three years the reconstruction was completed in 1876, and the garden was renamed to Liu Yuan. The name, while homophonous to an older name, connotes leisure and thus pays tribute to the former owner as well as the resort period of the garden.  It was at this time the "Auspicious Cloud Capped Peak" stone was moved to its current location.  The garden was inherited by Sheng Xuanhuai from his father although he abandoned the garden in 1911 and it fell into disrepair

During the Sino-Japanese War, the garden was abandoned again, and it even degenerated into a breeding zone for the army's horses.  After the establishment of the People's Republic of China, Suzhou government took over and renovated the garden.  It was reopened to the public in 1954.  In 2001 the garden was added to the UNESCO Word Heritage list, and remains a major tourist destination.

Since its creation the Lingering Garden has been well received by critics and has inspired artists.  The East Garden is described and praised in Sketches of Gardens and Pavilions by Yuan Hongdao (magistrate of Changzhou County), "...It is the best of its kind south of the Yangtze River." It was also described in the work Notes on the Hou Yue Tang by Jiang Yingke (magistrate of Wu County).  After the East Garden was transformed into the Lingering Garden it was again praised by Yu Yue in his Notes on Lingering Garden, "The rockeries plants pavilions towers and halls are among the best in Wu County."

Design

The 23,310 m2 garden is divided into four distinctly themed sections; East, Central, West, and North.  The Central area is the oldest part of the garden.  Buildings, the primary feature of any Chinese garden, occupy one third of the total area.  A unique feature of this garden is the 700m of covered walkway which connects them.  The built elements of the garden are grouped by section.  The ensemble of structures in the central garden encircles a pond and grotto main feature.  The grotto is constructed of yellowstone granite and was created by the noted artist Zhou Binzhong. The eastern section of the garden is arrayed around the cloud-capped peak stone.  A central courtyard is ringed by buildings.  Behind the Old Hermit Scholars' House is the Small Court of Stone Forest, a collection of Scholar stones and connected minor courtyards. The western section is mostly natural, containing only a few pavilions, a large artificial hill, and a Penzai garden.

See also
List of Chinese gardens

Notes

References

 China culture

External links

 
 
 
 CCT5667: Classical gardens

Classical Gardens of Suzhou
Major National Historical and Cultural Sites in Jiangsu